William Zeiman was a Democratic member of the Wisconsin State Assembly. Zeiman was a member during the 1877 session from the 1st District of Dodge County, Wisconsin. He was born on March 31, 1846, in what is now North Prairie, Wisconsin in what is now Waukesha County, Wisconsin.

References

People from North Prairie, Wisconsin
People from Dodge County, Wisconsin
Democratic Party members of the Wisconsin State Assembly
1846 births
Year of death missing